Zoom Torino is a zoo and amusement park in Cumiana, near Turin, northern Italy, created in 2007.

The zoo is meant to represent the continents of Asia and Africa using immersive exhibits.

Animals

Fishes
Cichlids

Reptiles
European pond turtle
Aldabra giant tortoise

Birds

Mammals

References

External links

Zoos in Italy
Tourist attractions in Piedmont
Parks in Piedmont
Buildings and structures in Piedmont
Zoos established in 2007
Cumiana